J'attendrai is the 31st studio album by 
Dalida.

Track listing
 J'attendrai
 L'amour à la une
 C'est mieux comme ça
 Il venait d'avoir 18 ans
 Et de l'amour... de l'amour
 Ta femme
 Ne lui dis pas
 Raphaël
 Mein lieber herr
 Gigi l'amoroso

Singles
1975 Dalida & St-Germain : Et de l'amour... de l'amour
1975 Mein lieber herr
1975 Ne lui dis pas
1976 J'attendrai

See also
 Dalida
 List of Dalida songs
 Dalida albums discography
 Dalida singles discography

References
 Dalida Official Website

External links
 Dalida Official Website "Discography" section

Dalida albums
1975 albums